Boris Vasilyevich Tokarev (Russian: Борис Васильевич Токарев) is a Soviet and Russian actor, film director and screenplay writer. He is a Meritorious Artist of RSFSR.

Biography 

Boris Tokarev was born in the village of Kiselyovo, Kaluga Oblast, USSR. Some years later the family moved to Moscow where Boris entered school.

When Boris was 12 years old when he made his debut in cinema. He played Victor in Georgy Pobedonostsev's film "The rescued generation". When he was 13 he was invited to Pushkin's theatre, accepting a role in a play.

As a schoolboy, Boris acted in some films. While he was a student of Gerasimov Institute of Cinematography, he took part in some more films such as: "The way to a sea", "The sixth summer", "Faithfulness".

After graduation Boris Tokarev joined the Theatre of the Soviet Army. However, he worked there just a year as he mostly liked cinema.

Private life 
Working under the film "Where are you now, Maxim?" Boris Tokarev got acquainted with Lyudmila Gladunko and she became his wife in 1969. Boris and Lyudmila have son Stepan.

Filmography

Actor 
 1959 — The Rescued generation — Victor
 1963 — The blue notebook
 1963 — Introduction to Life — Volodya
 1964 — Where are you now, Maxim? — Maxim
 1964 — Chamber
 1965 — Faithfulness
 1965 — The way to a sea — Tolya
 1967 — The sixth summer
 1969 — Knyaz Igor — knyaz Vladimir
 1970 — Морской характер — Andrei Korotkikh
 1971 — If you are a man ... — Pashka Snegiryov
 1971 — Stolen train — Rubashkin
 1972 — The Dawns Here Are Quiet… — Osyanin, Rita's husband
 1976 — The Two Captains - Sania Grigoriev 
 1981 — Little Alexander

Director 
 1982 — We Weren't Married in Church
 1985 — Ploshchad Vosstaniya
 1987 — Nochnoy ekipazh (English title: The Night Crew)
 1992 — Otshel'nik (The Hermit)
 2001 — Don't leave me, love
 2003 — Moya Prechistenka (English titles: My Prechistenka Street, Two Loves)
 2009 — The Distance

Writer 
 1985 — Ploshchad Vosstaniya

References

External links 
 Boris Tokarev at kino-teatr.ru
 

Soviet film directors
Russian film directors
1947 births
Living people
Soviet male film actors
Russian male film actors
20th-century Russian male actors
Recipients of the Vasilyev Brothers State Prize of the RSFSR
Recipients of the Lenin Komsomol Prize
Gerasimov Institute of Cinematography alumni